The 2013 Bucknell Bison football team represented Bucknell University in the 2013 NCAA Division I FCS football season. They were led by fourth-year head coach Joe Susan and played their home games at Christy Mathewson–Memorial Stadium. They were a member of the Patriot League. They finished the season 6–5, 3–2 in Patriot League play to finish in a three way tie for second place.

Schedule

Source: Schedule

References

Bucknell
Bucknell Bison football seasons
Bucknell Bison football